Fred Groves (8 August 1880 – 4 June 1955) was a British actor of the celebrated Groves acting family. On stage from 1896, he appeared in the original West End production of Noël Coward's Cavalcade (1931-2); and was a leading man in silent films, latterly becoming a character player in movies. He appeared in the 1925 play Number 17 in the West End.

He was a son of Charles Groves (1843-1909), a well-known Victorian and Edwardian comedic actor who made appearances on Broadway and in London's West End. He was also a nephew of the Fred Karno comedian Walter Groves (1856-1906), and a half-brother to the film and stage actor Charles Groves (1875-1955).

Among his feature film appearances was the comedy Sally In Our Alley. It marked the screen debut of Gracie Fields, an established music hall star. Gracie's husband, the screenwriter Archie Pitt was set to play the leading role of Alf Cope, but during the first week of filming, as Fields and Pitt were travelling back from shooting, their car crashed. Though Fields escaped injury, Pitt was forced to withdraw from the cast in order to recuperate. Due to his experience and availability, the role was quickly recast with Groves taking Pitt's place.

Selected filmography

 Maria Marten (1913, Short) - William Corder
 Popsy Wopsy (1913)
 The Suicide Club (1914) - The President
 The Loss of the Birkenhead (1914) - Seth
 Her Luck in London (1914) - Richard Lenowen
 The Idol of Paris (1914) - Philippe Castelle
 Honeymoon for Three (1915) - Cornelius V. Van Dam
 Gilbert Gets Tiger-It is (1915, Short) - Gilbert
 Gilbert Dying to Die (1915, Short) - Gilbert
 Florence Nightingale (1915) - Doctor
 From Shopgirl to Duchess (1915) - Duke of St. Baynum
 The World's Desire (1915) - Sir Richard Bennett
 Her Nameless Child (1915) - Arthur Ford
 Home (1915) - Steven Armitage
 Mr. Lyndon at Liberty (1915) - Tom Morrison
 Fine Feathers (1915) - Richard Dean
 Charity Ann (1915) - Graham Trevor
 A Will of Her Own (1915) - Dr. Blake
 The Firm of Girdlestone (1915) - Ezra Girdlestone
 Meg the Lady (1916) - Giles Curwen
 Esther (1916, Short) - Haman
 Driven (1916) - John Staffurth
 The Two Roads (1916) - Reverend Basil Egerton
 The Manxman (1916) - Pete Quillian - A fisherman
 Mother Love (1916) - Alfie
 Smith (1917) - Tom Freeman
 Drink (1917) - Coupeau
 The Grit of a Jew (1917) - Russell
 The Labour Leader (1917) - John Webster
 Castle of Dreams (1919) - John Morton
 London Pride (1920) - Cuthbert Tunks
 Garryowen (1920) - Michael French
 Judge Not (1920) - Burke
 Squibs (1921) - PC Charlie Lee
 The Mayor of Casterbridge (1921) - Michael Henchard
 A Master of Craft (1922) - Captain Flower
 The Crimson Circle (1922) - Inspector Parr
 Squibs Wins the Calcutta Sweep (1922) - P. C. Lee
 Rogues of the Turf (1923) - Bill Higgins
 Squibs M.P. (1923) - PC Charlie Lee
 Squibs' Honeymoon (1923) - PC Charlie Lee
 Memories (1925, Short) - The Husband
 Suspense (1930) - Pvt. Lomax
 Escape (1930) - Shopkeeper
 Sally in Our Alley (1931) - Alf Cope
 Out of the Blue (1931) - Bannister Blair
 The World, the Flesh, the Devil (1932) - Dick Morgan
 The Ghost Camera (1933) - Innkeeper
 Puppets of Fate (1933) - Arthur Brandon
 A Glimpse of Paradise (1934) - Joshua Ware
 The Old Curiosity Shop (1934) - Showman (uncredited)
 Dance Band (1935) - Pantomime Act
 Beloved Imposter (1936) - Jack Harding
 Royal Cavalcade (1936) - Sam Waldock
 Second Bureau (1936) - Sgt. Colleret
 The Squeaker (1937) - Martin (uncredited)
 Vessel of Wrath (1938) - Dutch Sea Captain (uncredited)
 The Viper (1938) - Inspector Bradlaw
 The Challenge (1938) - Favre
 Strange Boarders (1938) - (uncredited)
 No Parking (1938) - Walsh
 Climbing High (1938) - Doorman (uncredited)
 21 Days (1940) - Barnes
 An Ideal Husband (1947) - Phipps, Goring's Butler
 Night Beat (1947) - PC Kendall
 My Brother Jonathan (1948) - Lisha Hodgkiss
 My Brother's Keeper (1948) - Landlord
 Old Mother Riley's New Venture (1949) - Grigsby
 Your Witness (1950) - Dart Player #6 (uncredited)
 The Girl Who Couldn't Quite (1950) - Manservant
 Up for the Cup (1950) - Hardcastle (final film role)

References

External links
 
 

Groves family
1880 births
1955 deaths
English male stage actors
English male film actors
English male silent film actors
Male actors from London
20th-century English male actors